Steven Brinkman (born ) is a Canadian male volleyball player. He was part of the Canada men's national volleyball team at the 2002 FIVB Volleyball Men's World Championship and 2006 FIVB Volleyball Men's World Championship.

References

1978 births
Canadian men's volleyball players
Living people